Tony Malakellis (born 24 March 1970) is a former Australian rules footballer who played with Geelong and the Sydney Swans in the Australian Football League (AFL). He is the younger brother of Spiro Malakellis.

Recruited locally, Malakellis made nine appearances for Geelong in 1990, all in the second half of the season. On his debut that year, against Carlton at Princes Park, Malakellis earned a Brownlow Medal vote for his 23 disposals and two goals. He played only five games in 1991 and didn't feature at all in the 1992 AFL season. Sydney secured his services in 1993 but he spent just one year at the club, before moving to South Australia and signing with Port Adelaide. He played 70 games for Port Adelaide, until retiring in 1998, and was a member of their 1994 and 1995 premiership teams. In 1994 he came runner up in the SANFL Magery Medal count.

References

1970 births
Living people
Australian people of Greek descent
Australian rules footballers from Victoria (Australia)
Geelong Football Club players
Sydney Swans players
Port Adelaide Football Club (SANFL) players
Port Adelaide Football Club players (all competitions)